Hay Street may refer to:

 Hay Street, Kalgoorlie, Australia
 Hay Street, Perth, Australia
 Hay Street, Sydney, Australia
 Hay Street, Hertfordshire, a village in England